Cha-licious is the debut studio album by female rap duo Menajahtwa. It was released on August 23, 1994 via Ruthless Records and Relativity Records. Recording sessions took place at Audio Achievements in Torrance, California, except for one song, "Kuz Itz Like Dat", which was recorded at the Black Hole in Hawthorne, California. Production was handled by DJ Yella, Rhythum D and Eazy-E.  It features guest appearances from B.G. Knocc Out & Dresta, Eazy-E, Traci Nelson and Leicy Loc. Neither the album, nor its lead single, "La La La", reached any Billboard chart.

Track listing

Personnel
Tanesha L. Hudson – main artist, vocals
Makeba Fields – main artist, vocals
Andre DeSean Wicker – featured artist (tracks: 5, 15)
Eric Wright – featured artist (track 8), executive producer
Leicy Loc – featured artist (track 4)
Traci Nelson – featured artist (track 6)
Arlandis Hinton – featured artist (track 12)
David "Rhythm D" Weldon – producer (tracks: 6, 10)
Tim Middleton – producer (track 5)
Don "D-Dawg" Spratley – co-producer (tracks: 3, 13)
Mike "Crazy Neck" Sims – guitar & bass
George Shelby – saxophone (track 11)
Donovan "The Dirt Biker" Sound – mixing & recording
Brian "Big Bass" Gardner – mastering
David Bett – art direction, photography
Allan Wai – design
Matt Gunther – photography

References

External links

1994 debut albums
Ruthless Records albums
Albums produced by DJ Yella
Albums produced by Rhythum D